Khatunabad (also Romanized as Khātūnābād) is a village in Khatunabad Rural District, in the Central District of Jiroft County, Kerman Province, Iran. At the 2006 census, its population was 788, in 171 families.

References 

Populated places in Jiroft County